Leanderson da Silva Genésio (born 1 October 1997), commonly known as Lelê, is a Brazilian footballer who plays as a forward for Volta Redonda, on loan from .

Club career

Lelê returned to Profute for the latter stages of the 2020 Campeonato Carioca Série B2, but rejoined Maricá for the 2021 season. On 20 December of that year, after helping Maricá to reach the Copa Rio finals and achieve a first-ever qualification to the Copa do Brasil, he joined Volta Redonda.

Lelê was regularly used for Voltaço during the 2022 campaign, winning both the Campeonato Carioca Série A2 and the Copa Rio. On 11 January 2023, his loan with Profute was renewed for a further year; Profute, however, confirm the extension of the loan until April.

On 28 February 2023, Série A side Fluminense announced the signing of Lelê on loan from Profute, with the player arriving at the club after the 2023 Campeonato Carioca.

Career statistics

Honours
Volta Redonda
Campeonato Carioca Série A2: 2022
Copa Rio: 2022

References

1997 births
Living people
Footballers from Rio de Janeiro (city)
Brazilian footballers
Association football forwards
Campeonato Brasileiro Série C players
Campeonato Brasileiro Série D players
Volta Redonda FC players